Film.ru, sometimes known in Russian as Фильм.ру, is a Russian web portal dedicated to cinema. The website publishes news, analytical articles, Russian film showtimes, box office performances, film reviews and maintains a film and tv show database. Founded in December 1999, it is one of the oldest Russian websites still operating that is dedicated to the film industry.

According to Kritikanstvo, Film.ru has published over 3,000 film reviews.

History 
Film.ru was created in 1999 by Sergei Aksyonov (born 6 September 1975) who also created the websites Arthouse.ru and Video Guide. The website was managed by Film LLC until 2006, when the website was acquired by Entertime. In 2007, Anton Kostylev was appointed editor-in-chief of Film.ru. During this time, the web traffic for the website tripled.
 
In 2013, Boris Khokhlov, former editor-in-chief of Total DVD and Russian Empire, became the editor-in-chief of Film.ru, after which the site had an independent editorial board. The site also began regular publications of articles and film reviews. Since July 2018, Ekaterina Karslidi, who previously worked on the Russian film website Cinemaholics, has been the editor-in-chief.

See also 
Cinema of Russia
Animator.ru – online film database for the Russian animation industry
KinoPoisk – Russian film database

References

External links 
Film.ru website (in Russian)

Online film databases
Russian film websites
Film review websites
Internet properties established in 1999